William Hughes, Baron Hughes CBE PC (22 January 1911 – 31 December 1999), was a Labour party politician in the United Kingdom.

Hughes was elected to Dundee Town Council in 1933 at the age of 22. In 1954 he became Lord Provost of Dundee, a post he held until 1960, while he remained a councillor until 1961. He was also a Justice of the Peace for the city from 1943 until 1974. In the Second World War Hughes was Dundee's civil defense controller until 1943, when he joined the armed forces. He was commissioned in 1944, becoming a Captain by the end of the conflict. He served in the Royal Army Ordnance Corps in India. Burma and Borneo. He stood in the 1945 and 1950 general elections as the Labour Party's candidate for Perth (known as Perth and East Perthshire from 1950), but was not elected, before becoming a life peer on 7 February 1961 as Baron Hughes, of Hawkhill in the City of Dundee, Scotland. Hughes resigned as councillor in March 1961, as he felt that 'he could not guarantee to be a fully effective member' of the body following his appointment to the House of Lords.

In Harold Wilson's first government, he served under Scottish Secretary Willie Ross as Under-Secretary of State for Scotland from 1964 to 1969, and then as Minister of State for Scotland from 1969 to 1970 and again from 1974 to 1975.  He was made a Privy Councillor in 1970. His obituary in The Herald noted he 'played a key role in persuading the government to proceed with the Tay Road Bridge, at the time the longest road bridge in Europe'. While serving in government, he also laid the foundation stone for Ninewells Hospital on 9 September 1965.

Hughes chaired both the Glenrothes and East Kilbride development corporations, and was also chairman of a royal commission on reforming Scottish legal services. After leaving ministerial office he remained an active peer and was noted for his attacks on the Thatcher and Major governments, on issues such as the introduction of the Poll Tax in Scotland, and Conservative claims about the possible  economic impact of Scottish home rule.

His honours included the OBE in 1942, raised to a CBE in 1956, receiving the Légion d'honneur (Chevalier) in 1958 and becoming a Privy Counsellor in 1970. He was also appointed as Deputy Lieutenant of the City of Dundee in 1992.

Lord Hughes was survived by two daughters. His wife Christian died in 1994.

Footnotes

References

External links
 

1911 births
1999 deaths
Labour Party (UK) life peers
Commanders of the Order of the British Empire
Chevaliers of the Légion d'honneur
Members of the Privy Council of the United Kingdom
Scottish Labour parliamentary candidates
People from Dundee
Lord Provosts of Dundee
Deputy Lieutenants of Dundee
Politicians from Dundee
Ministers in the Wilson governments, 1964–1970
British Army personnel of World War II
Royal Army Ordnance Corps officers
Life peers created by Elizabeth II